The Wizard is the second album by American blues guitarist Mel Brown recorded in 1968 for the Impulse! label.

Reception
The Allmusic review awarded the album 2 stars.

Track listing
All compositions by Mel Brown except as indicated
 "Ode to Billie Joe" (Bobbie Gentry) - 4:23   
 "Swamp Fever" - 6:05   
 "Blues After Hours" (Pee Wee Crayton, Jules Taub) - 6:34   
 "African Sweets" (Dee Ervin) - 3:10   
 "Stop" (Jerry Ragovoy) -  4:21   
 "Chuck a Funk" - 4:53   
 "Miss Ann" - 4:10   
 "W-2 Withholding" - 2:12  
Recorded in Los Angeles, California on March 21, 1968

Personnel
Mel Brown - guitar
Terry Evans - guitar
Mack Johnston - trumpet
Clifford Solomon - tenor saxophone
Unknown - piano, organ
Ronald Brown - bass 
Paul Humphrey - drums 
Roy Brown - vocals

References

Impulse! Records albums
Albums produced by Bob Thiele
Mel Brown (guitarist) albums
1968 albums